Go All the Way is the third album by hard rock band China. It was released in 1991 by the label Vertigo. The vocalist in this album is Eric St. Michaels.

Track listing

Charts

References

China (band) albums
1991 albums
Vertigo Records albums